Kim Hyun-mee (Korean: 김현미; born September 20, 1967), also spelled Kim Hyun-mi or Kim Hyeon-mi, is a South Korean team handball player. She competed at the 1988 Summer Olympics and won a gold medal with the South Korean team, and was  voted World Handball Player of the Year 1989 by the International Handball Federation.

References

External links

1967 births
Living people
South Korean female handball players
Olympic gold medalists for South Korea
Olympic medalists in handball
Handball players at the 1988 Summer Olympics
Medalists at the 1988 Summer Olympics